Alex Zülle (born 5 July 1968) is a Swiss former professional road bicycle racer. During the 1990s he was one of the most successful cyclists in the world, winning the 1996 and 1997 Vuelta a España, taking second place in the 1995 and the 1999 Tour de France. He was world time-trial champion in Lugano in 1996.

Biography

Early career

Zülle was born and brought up in Wil in the canton of St. Gallen, son of a Swiss father, Walter Zülle and Wilhelmine, from Brabant, Netherlands. As a child he wanted to be a skier but at 18 he was injured in an accident. He began cycling in the Netherlands for rehabilitation before giving up because it was too windy.

His father, having bought cycling equipment, persuaded him to give cycling another go when they returned to Switzerland. After several years as a successful amateur, Zülle turned professional in 1991. He approached the former sporting director of the Swiss team, Helvetia, Paul Köchli, but Köchli signed Laurent Dufaux instead.

Zülle then approached Manolo Saiz, but was rebuffed because, among reasons, he did not contract riders who wore earrings. Eventually, Saiz softened and Zülle rode for ONCE as a stagaire or apprentice in the Volta a Catalunya. He attacked frequently and finished third. Saiz relented and Zülle signed his first professional contract in September 1991. He remained with ONCE until 1997. Most of its riders were Spanish. Zülle spoke only Swiss-German when he joined but at the end of the Vuelta a España he answered journalists in Spanish.

Festina affair
In 1998, Zülle joined Festina. The team was banned from the 1998 Tour de France amid doping allegations which later became known as the Festina affair. Five Festina riders including Zülle admitted taking EPO. Zülle said he took it to satisfy his sponsors. He also said he was deprived of his spectacles during the police interview. On 28 November 1998, Zülle's haematocrit was found to be 52.3%, 2.3% over the limit.

1999–2004
His career coincided with that of Miguel Indurain, five-times Tour de France winner. Zülle was second in the Tour in 1999. He also won the Vuelta a España and Tour de Suisse, and stages in the Giro d'Italia.

Zülle retired in 2004, and held a party for his fans in Wil in October that year.

Career achievements

Major results

1990 
 1st Flèche du Sud
1991
 1st  Overall Grand Prix Guillaume Tell
1st Prologue, Stage 2 & 4 
 3rd Overall Volta a Catalunya
 4th Trofeo Masferrer
1992
 1st  Overall Setmana Catalana de Ciclisme
 1st  Overall Vuelta a Asturias
1st Stage 1b (ITT)
 1st  Overall Vuelta a Burgos
1st Stage 5 (ITT)
 1st  Overall Escalada a Montjuïc
1st Stage 1a 
 1st Stage 4 (ITT) Volta a Catalunya
 1st Stage 2 Settimana Internazionale di Coppi e Bartali
 3rd Gran Piemonte
 4th Overall Tour of the Basque Country
 4th Grand Prix des Nations
 5th Milano–Torino
 9th Wincanton Classic
1993
 1st  Overall Paris–Nice
1st Prologue & Stage 7b (ITT)
 1st Chur-Arosa
 1st Josef Voegeli Memorial
 2nd Overall Vuelta a España
1st Stages 1 (ITT), 6 (ITT) & 21 (ITT)
 3rd Overall Tour of the Basque Country
 3rd Overall Critérium International
 5th Overall Euskal Bizikleta
 6th Overall Volta a Catalunya
1994
 1st Stage 1 (ITT) Volta a Catalunya
 1st Stage 6 (ITT) Vuelta a Aragón
 2nd Overall Vuelta a La Rioja
 4th Overall Vuelta a España
 8th Overall Volta a la Comunitat Valenciana
1995
 1st  Overall Tour of the Basque Country
1st Stages 3 & 5b (ITT)
 1st  Overall Volta a la Comunitat Valenciana
1st Stage 2b
 1st Challenge Mallorca
 1st Stage 16 Vuelta a España
 2nd Overall Tour de Suisse
1st  Points classification
1st Prologue & Stage 5 (ITT)
 2nd Overall Tour de France
1st Stage 9
 2nd Overall Setmana Catalana de Ciclisme
1st Stage 5b (ITT)
 2nd Overall Euskal Bizikleta
1st Stage 4b (ITT)
 3rd Overall Paris–Nice
1996
 1st  Time trial, UCI Road World Championships
 1st  Overall Vuelta a España
1st Stage 15
 1st  Overall Volta a Catalunya
1st Prologue, Stages 3 (ITT) & 6 (ITT)
 1st  Overall Setmana Catalana de Ciclisme
1st Stage 3 & 5b (ITT)
 1st GP Miguel Indurain
 1st Prologue Tour de France
 2nd Overall Euskal Bizikleta
1st Stage 4b (ITT)
 7th Time trial, Olympic Games
 8th Overall Escalada a Montjuïc
1997
 1st  Overall Vuelta a España
1st Stage 21 (ITT)
 1st  Overall Tour of the Basque Country
1st Stage 5b (ITT)
 2nd Overall Setmana Catalana de Ciclisme
 2nd Overall Escalada a Montjuïc
 2nd Milano–Torino
 3rd La Flèche Wallonne
 5th Overall Vuelta a Murcia
1998
 Giro d'Italia
1st Prologue, Stages 6 & 15 (ITT)
 2nd Overall Tour de Romandie
1st Stage 4b (ITT)
 3rd Overall Tour of the Basque Country
 3rd Overall Setmana Catalana de Ciclisme
1st Stage 5b (ITT)
 4th Overall Paris–Nice
 5th Grand Prix Eddy Merckx (with Christophe Bassons)
 8th Overall Vuelta a España
1st Stage 21 (ITT) 
1999
 1st À travers Lausanne
 1st Stage 13 Vuelta a España
 2nd Overall Tour de France
 6th Breitling Grand Prix (with José Vicente García
 10th Time trial, UCI Road World Championships
2000
 1st  Overall Volta ao Algarve
1st Stage 4 (ITT)
 1st Stage 1 (ITT) Vuelta a España
 4th Overall Critérium du Dauphiné Libéré
 7th Overall Euskal Bizikleta
2001
 1st Stage 4 Paris–Nice
 3rd Overall Vuelta a Asturias
 9th Overall Tour of the Basque Country
2002
 1st  Overall Tour de Suisse
1st Prologue
 1st  Overall Volta a la Comunitat Valenciana
1st Stage 5 (ITT)
 2nd Overall Tour de Romandie
1st  Points classification
1st Stage 4 & 5 (ITT)
 2nd Overall Volta ao Algarve
1st Stage 2 
 4th GP Triberg-Schwarzwald
 5th Deutschland Tour
2003
 3rd Overall Vuelta a Castilla y León
 7th Overall Volta a la Comunitat Valenciana
2004 
 5th Overall Volta a la Comunitat Valenciana

General classification results timeline

See also
Doping at the Tour de France
List of doping cases in cycling
List of sportspeople sanctioned for doping offences

References

External links

Swiss male cyclists
1968 births
Living people
Vuelta a España winners
Olympic cyclists of Switzerland
Cyclists at the 1996 Summer Olympics
Cyclists at the 2000 Summer Olympics
UCI Road World Champions (elite men)
Tour de France prologue winners
Swiss Giro d'Italia stage winners
Doping cases in cycling
Swiss Vuelta a España stage winners
Swiss sportspeople in doping cases
People from Wil
Tour de Suisse stage winners
Sportspeople from the canton of St. Gallen